Moldovan or Moldovanu is a common surname in Romania and Moldova. It may refer to any of the following:

People named Moldovan
 Aleksandr Mikhailovich Moldovan, Ukrainian and Russian linguist
 Leonte Moldovan, Romanian politician
 Marcela Moldovan-Zsak, Romanian fencer
 Oleg Moldovan, Moldovan sports shooter and Olympic medalist
 Ovidiu Iuliu Moldovan, Romanian actor
 Sacha Moldovan, American painter
 Tibor Moldovan, Romanian football player
 Tudor Miclovan (also "Moldovan"), fictional detective
 Valeriu Moldovan, Romanian politician
 Vasile Moldovan, ethnic Romanian revolutionary in Transylvania
 Viorel Moldovan, Romanian football player

People named Moldovanu
 Benny Moldovanu, German economist
 Corneliu Moldovanu, Romanian poet
 Mihail Moldovanu, Moldovan politician

See also
Moldoveanu (surname)

Surnames of Moldovan origin
Romanian-language surnames
Ethnonymic surnames

tr:Moldovan